Billy Murcia (October 9, 1951 – November 6, 1972) was the original drummer for the New York Dolls.

Biography 
Murcia was born in Bogotá, Colombia, and raised in Jackson Heights, New York, United States.

He and Sylvain Sylvain both attended Quintano's School for Young Professionals, in the late sixties. It was at Quintano's that they met Johnny Thunders, also a student there. They made their musical debut in 1967, in a band called "The Pox". They owned and co-managed a clothing business called "Truth and Soul". Murcia was a fundamental ingredient of the original New York Dolls sound and played during their now-legendary series of weekly shows at the Mercer Arts Center.

While on a brief tour of England in 1972, Murcia was invited to a party where he passed out from an accidental heroin drug overdose. In an attempt to revive him he was put in a bathtub and force-fed coffee, which resulted in asphyxiation and death. He died before the New York Dolls recorded their first album and was later replaced by Jerry Nolan in 1973. The final gig of their tour, at the Manchester Hardrock, was canceled, and the band flew back to New York City. Murcia can be heard playing live with the New York Dolls on Lipstick Killers: The Mercer Street Sessions.

Johnny Thunders wrote a song called "Billy Boy", in honor of his friend and former band member. It was recorded on Que Sera Sera in 1985.

The song "Time", from David Bowie's Aladdin Sane album, references Murcia and his untimely demise.

References 

1951 births
1972 deaths
Musicians from Bogotá
Colombian rock musicians
American punk rock drummers
American male drummers
Colombian emigrants to the United States
People from Jackson Heights, Queens
New York Dolls members
20th-century American drummers
Accidental deaths in London
Deaths from asphyxiation
20th-century American male musicians